The Society of Ancients (SoA) is an international, non-profit organization based in the UK that aims to promote interest in Ancient & Medieval history and wargaming, covering the periods from 3000BC to 1500AD.

The Society
The Society publishes a bi-monthly journal entitled Slingshot. Membership proceeds are used, among other things, to fund the publication of the magazine and to sponsor wargames competitions which fall within the society's remit. The Society commonly has a presence at large conventions across the UK and overseas.

Founded in 1965 by Tony Bath, the Society started with 20 members. During the next decade it increased in membership by at least 50% every year.  Since then its growth has continued - currently it has a worldwide membership of more than 1200. Early members included the actor Deryck Guyler (who served as president of the society), the academic George Gush, Tony Bath and Phil Barker, co-creator of the many sets of rules published by WRG including the De Bellis Antiquitatis wargames rules.

The society concentrates on historical wargaming - a decision to exclude fantasy was made around ten years after it was founded.
Among other events it has organized one-day events where a single historical battle is re-enacted using a number of different rulesets.  These battles have included Gaugamela, the Sambre, Cynoscephalae,  Kadesh, Zama and Plataea.

Slingshot 

The society publishes a bi-monthly journal, "Slingshot".  It has been described as the periodical of most interest to ancient Wargamers. Some of the  articles are quite technical - ancient military maneuvers, ancient arms and armor and similar, as well as material specifically about wargaming, such as rules and war game reports. It is occasionally referenced in academic publications.  Contributing writers include noted historians such as Adrian Goldsworthy and Boris Rankov. Other professional historians who have written for Slingshot include Philip Sabin, Matthew Bennett, Guy Halsall, Paddy Griffith, Nigel Tallis and Steve Badsey. Other contributors have become published authors, either before, or subsequently to their contributions. The magazine has also carried material written by notable games designers (for example, Phil Barker, Richard Bodley Scott, Jervis Johnson, Rick Priestley and Neil Thomas).

Initially, Slingshot was edited by Tony Bath and indeed was produced by him with the help of his wife using a borrowed duplicator.  When this fell through, Tony Bath was able to purchase cheaply a spirit duplicator with which it was produced from May 1965. From March 1969 it has been commercially printed.

Other Publications 

The Society has also published a number of wargames with ancient or medieval themes, including:
 Gladiolus (1992), a card-based game of gladiatorial single combat.
 Legion (1997), a board game that simulates ancient battle on a hex grid.
 Lytel GuÞan (1999), a skirmish game for Dark Ages Britain.
 The Saxon Shore is Burning (2002, revised edition 2018), a strategic game of the so-called Barbarian Conspiracy against Roman Britain of AD 367.

External References to the Society 

Almost since the Society's inception, it has been a commonplace for books about ancient and medieval wargaming, and relevant rule sets, to mention the society. Examples of wargaming books include:
 The Ancient War Game, by Charles Grant
 Ancient Wargaming, by Phil Barker
 Introduction to Battle Gaming, by Terence Wise
 Wargames Through the Ages, 3000BC to 1500AD, by Donald Featherstone

Examples of wargaming rule sets which reference the society include:

 De Bellis Antiquitatis, by Phil Barker
 De Bellis Multitudinis by Phil Barker
 Warhammer Ancient Battles (WAB), by Jervis Johnson, Rick Priestley, Alan and Michael Perry

External links
The Society of Ancients Website
Slingshot Index
an article from Slingshot

References

Wargaming associations